The Tzrifin attack was a suicide bombing, which occurred on 9 September 2003 in a bus stop in central Israel next to the military base Tzrifin. 9 IDF soldiers were killed in the attack and more than 15 soldiers were injured.

The suicide bomber was a member of the Palestinian organization Hamas and was a resident of the Palestinian village Rantis in the West Bank.

The attack
During the evening hours of Tuesday, 9 September 2003, a Palestinian militant who was holding a bag full of explosives, approached a bus stop near the Israeli military base Tzrifin, located on the eastern side of Rishon LeZion. The bus station was full of Israeli soldiers who were on their way home.

Around 17:50 pm the bomber detonated the explosive device. The force of the explosion killed 9 soldiers and injured more than 15. All the fatalities in the attack were soldiers.

Five hours after the attack, another terrorist attack was carried out at Café Hillel in Jerusalem in which 7 people were killed over 30 people were injured.

See also 
 Café Hillel bombing

References

External links 
Suicide Bombings- Tzrifin and Jerusalem - September 9- 2003 - published at the Israeli Ministry of Foreign Affairs
 Two separate suicide bombings kill at least 15 in Israel - published on USA Today on 9 September 2003
 Suicide attack at Israeli army base - published on BBC News on 9 September 2003
 MidEast: Suicide Blast Kills Eight - published on Sky News on 9 September 2003

Suicide bombing in the Israeli–Palestinian conflict
September 2003 events in Asia
Hamas attacks
Attacks on bus stations
Building bombings in Israel